Shishapangma, also called Gosainthān, is the 14th-highest mountain in the world, at  above sea level. In 1964, it became the last of the 8,000-metre peaks to be climbed. This was due to its location entirely within Tibet and the restrictions on visits by foreign travelers to the region imposed by Chinese authorities.

Name
Geologist Toni Hagen explained the name as meaning a "grassy plain" or "meadow" above a "comb" or a "range" ( or ) in the local Tibetan language, thereby signifying the "crest above the grassy plains".

According to the story, one year a heavy snowfall killed most of the animals at pasture. All that the people living near the mountain had to eat was the meat of the dead animals and the malt dregs left over from brewing beer, and so the mountain was named Shisha Pangma, signifying "meat of dead animals and malty dregs".

The Sanskrit name of the mountain, Gosainthan, means "place of the saint" or "Abode of God". The name is in use in popular literature. For example, in the comic strip Tintin In Tibet, a fictional Air India flight had crashed at Gosainthan. Tintin, Captain Haddock and the Sherpa team travelged to Gosainthan in search of Chang Chong-Chen.

Geography
Shishapangma is located in south-central Tibet, five kilometres from the border with Nepal. It along with Nanga Parbat is the only eight-thousander entirely within Chinese and Pakistan territory respectively. It is also the highest peak in the Jugal Himal, which is contiguous with and often considered part of Langtang Himal. The Jugal/Langtang Himal straddles the Tibet/Nepal border. Since Shishapangma is on the dry north side of the Himalayan crest and farther from the lower terrain of Nepal, it has less dramatic vertical relief than most major Himalayan peaks.

Ascents and attempts 
Respected Himalayan chronicler and record keeper Elizabeth Hawley famously got Ed Viesturs (amongst others) to re-climb the true main summit of Shishapangma in his quest to climb all 14 eight-thousanders, as she would not accept central (or west) summit ascents as being full ascents of Shishapangma for her Himalayan Database .

Thirty-one people have died climbing Shishapangma, including Americans Alex Lowe and Dave Bridges in 1999, veteran Portuguese climber Bruno Carvalho, and noted Bulgarian climber Boyan Petrov, who disappeared on 3 May 2018. Nevertheless, Shishapangma is regarded as one of the easiest eight-thousanders to climb. Routes on the steeper southwest face are more technically demanding and involve  of ascent on a 50-degree slope.

First ascent
Shishapangma was first climbed, via the Northern Route, on 2 May 1964 by a Chinese expedition led by Xǔ Jìng. In addition to Xǔ Jìng, the summit team consisted of Zhāng Jùnyán (张俊岩), Wang Fuzhou, Wū Zōngyuè (邬宗岳), Chén Sān (陈三), Soinam Dorjê (索南多吉), Chéng Tiānliàng (成天亮), Migmar Zhaxi (米马扎西), Dorjê (多吉), and Yún Dēng (云登).

Later ascents and attempts 
 1980 7 May, "Northern Route", (second ascent) by Michael Dacher, Wolfgang Schaffert, Gunter Sturm, Fritz Zintl, Sigi Hupfauer and Manfred Sturm (12 May); as part of a German expedition.
 1980: 13 October, "Northern Route", (3rd ascent) by Ewald Putz and Egon Obojes, as part of an Austrian expedition.
 1981: 30 April, "Northern Route", (4th ascent) by Junko Tabei, Rinzing Phinzo and Gyalbu Jiabu, as part of a Japanese women's expedition.
 1981: 28 May, "Northern Route", (5th ascent) by Reinhold Messner and Friedl Mutschlechner, as part of an Austrian expedition.
 1982: 28 May, "British Route", southwest face, also known as "Right-hand couloir" (alpine style), FA by Doug Scott, Alex Macintyre and Roger Baxter-Jones (all UK). This route follows the right-hand couloir on the southwest face.
 1987: 18 September, Elsa Ávila and Carlos Carsolio become the first Mexicans to summit Shishapangma. This was Ávila's first eight-thousander and Carsolio's second, via the northern face/ridge to the central summit, then along the arete to the main summit, with Wanda Rutkiewicz, Ramiro Navarrete, and Ryszard Warecki.
 1987: 18 September, west ridge, FA by Jerzy Kukuczka and Artur Hajzer (both Polish). A new route along the ridge west, by the western summit (first entry) and continuing through by the middle summit on the main summit. Kukuczka skied down from near the summit. This was the last of his fourteen eight-thousanders.
 1987: 19 September, central couloir, north face, FA by Alan Hinkes (UK) and Steve Untch (US).
 1989: 19 October, Central buttress, southwest face, FA by Andrej Stremfelj and Pavle Kozjek.
 1990: Left-hand couloir, southwest face (not reaching the main summit), Wojciech Kurtyka (Poland), FA by Erhard Loretan (Switzerland) and Jean Troillet (Switzerland)
 1993: Far-right couloir, southwest face, FA solo by Krzysztof Wielicki (Poland)
 1993: May 22, Marcos Couch and Nicolás De la Cruz (Argentinian expedition)
 1994: Left-hand couloir, southwest face (not reaching the main summit), Erik Decamp (France), Catherine Destivelle (France)
 1996: 9 October, Anatoli Boukreev completed a solo ascent.
 1999: 28 September, Edmond Joyeusaz (Italy), first ski descent from central summit.
 2002: 5 May, "Korean Route" on southwest face, FA by Park Jun Hun and Kang Yeon Ryoung (both South Korean)
 2002 26 October: Tomaž Humar(Slovenia), Maxut Zhumayev, Denis Urubko, Alexey Raspopov and Vassily Pivtsov got to the summit. Tomaž Humar climbed last 200 m (80°/50–60°, 200 m) of ascent and descent (65–75°, 700 m)
 2004: 11 December, Jean-Christophe Lafaille (France) provoked controversy when he climbed the "British Route" on the southwest face, solo, and claimed a winter ascent. Since this was not calendar winter, he changed his claim to an ascent "in winter conditions."
 2005: 14 January, first (calendar) winter ascent by Piotr Morawski (Poland) and Simone Moro (Italy).
 2011: 16–17 April, Ueli Steck (Switzerland) soloed the southwest face in 10.5 hours, leaving base camp (5,306m) at 10:30 pm on 16 April and returning to base camp 20 hours later.
 2014: September 24, Sebastian Haag died along with the Italian mountaineer Andrea Zambaldi in an avalanche. Haag was 36 years old.
 2018: May 3, Bulgarian climber Boyan Petrov disappeared after having been last seen at Camp 3 (~7,400 m). A subsequent two-week search effort found only a few personal items and medicine.
2019: October 29, Nirmal Purja (Nepal) made it to the top of Shishapangma six months and six days after summiting his first 8000-metre peak as part of his Project Possible to climb all 14 8000-metre summits in seven months.

References

Sources
 A Photographic Record of the Mount Shisha Pangma Scientific Expedition. Science Press Peking, 1966.
 
 
 Sale, Richard; Cleare, John (2000): On Top of the World (Climbing the World's 14 Highest Mountains), lists of ascents, HarperCollins Publishers, .

External links

Shisha Pangma main page on Himalaya-Info.org
Shisha Pangma description on Summitpost

Shisha Pangma on www.8000ers.com, the complete list of ascent up to 2009 by Eberhard Jurgalski (PDF)
Shisha Pangma on everestnews.com, photodiagram of the routes on the SW face
himalaya-info.org panoramas from the slopes and peak of Shisha Pangma with exact explanations, images 6 to 13 are from the very top. The topography of variations to the normal route from northern side is explained by the two last photographs (no. 13 and 14), including the view from main summit to the other two. 

Eight-thousanders of the Himalayas
Mountains of Tibet
Climbing areas of China